Isleton is a city in Sacramento County, California, United States. The population was 804 at the 2010 census, down from 828 at the 2000 census. It is located on Andrus Island amid the slough wetlands of the Sacramento-San Joaquin River Delta, on the eastern edge of the Rio Vista Gas Field. The city has many preserved 19th-century era storefronts along its main street, some of which show distinct Chinese influences.

Isleton is part of the Sacramento–Arden-Arcade–Roseville Metropolitan Statistical Area. California State Route 160 passes through the city and crosses the 1923 Isleton Bridge.

History
Isleton was founded 1874 by Josiah Poole. After having the town platted, he constructed a wharf on the Sacramento River, and a booming town soon followed. However, Isleton was flooded in 1878 and 1881, causing Poole financial difficulties and leading him to move out. The town also flooded in 1890, 1907, and 1972. As agriculture in the surrounding area developed, three canneries opened up in Isleton and other delta towns. The cannery workforce was over 90 percent Asian.

The Hotel del Rio in Isleton was built in 1949. It contains one of California's legal card rooms. This featured in the case of Novo vs. Hotel del Rio, decided 4 May 1956, reported in 141 C.A. 2nd, pg 304. This case created a stir because, although gambling debts are not enforceable at law, if money is lost that falls under California's community property laws, it may be recovered if can be shown that permission was not given by the other spouse to gamble the money. The case attracted nationwide attention, and was used by Erle Stanley Gardner in his 1959 Perry Mason crime novel The Case of the Singing Skirt.

Chinese began immigrating to Isleton around 1875, and at its peak, the Chinese section of the city had about 1,500 people and included a branch of the Bing Kong Tong. The city also had a Japantown, just east of Chinatown. The Chinese and Japanese districts are in the National Register of Historic Places. (Actor Pat Morita was born in Isleton in 1932.)

As the canneries folded, the population started to decline, although it has started to rebound since 2010. Its economy was badly hit by the recession in 2007. In 2010, Isleton attempted to raise money by permitting a marijuana farm in return for a share of the profits, but it was abandoned after warnings from the U.S. Department of Justice.
In 2012, the city lost its police department.

Geography
Isleton is located at  (38.161861, -121.609269).

Climate
According to the Köppen Climate Classification system, Isleton has a warm-summer Mediterranean climate, abbreviated "Csa" on climate maps.

Demographics

2010
At the 2010 census Isleton had a population of 804. The ethnic makeup of Isleton was 542 (67.4%) White, 316 (39.3%) Hispanic or Latino, 10 (1.2%) African American, 10 (1.2%) Native American, 41 (5.1%) Asian, 4 (0.5%) Pacific Islander, 139 (17.3%) from other races, and 58 (7.2%) from two or more races.

The whole population lived in households, no one lived in non-institutionalized group quarters and no one was institutionalized.

There were 331 households, 96 (29.0%) had children under the age of 18 living in them, 109 (32.9%) were heterosexual married couples living together, 46 (13.9%) had a female householder with no husband present, 23 (6.9%) had a male householder with no wife present.  There were 25 (7.6%) unmarried heterosexual partnerships, and 4 (1.2%) homosexual married couples or partnerships. 125 households (37.8%) were one person and 51 (15.4%) had someone living alone who was 65 or older. The average household size was 2.43.  There were 178 families (53.8% of households); the average family size was 3.35.

The age distribution was 191 people (23.8%) under the age of 18, 71 people (8.8%) aged 18 to 24, 172 people (21.4%) aged 25 to 44, 235 people (29.2%) aged 45 to 64, and 135 people (16.8%) who were 65 or older.  The median age was 42.1 years. For every 100 females, there were 107.2 males.  For every 100 females age 18 and over, there were 114.3 males.

There were 425 housing units at an average density of 865.3 per square mile, of the occupied units 184 (55.6%) were owner-occupied and 147 (44.4%) were rented. The homeowner vacancy rate was 11.9%; the rental vacancy rate was 19.7%.  436 people (54.2% of the population) lived in owner-occupied housing units and 368 people (45.8%) lived in rental housing units.

2000

At the 2000 census there were 828 people in 343 households, including 209 families, in the city. The racial makeup of the city was 69.57% White, 1.45% African American, 1.45% Native American, 9.78% Asian, 0.24% Pacific Islander, 10.02% from other races, and 7.49% from two or more races. Hispanic or Latino of any race were 26.93%.

Of the 343 households 29.7% had children under the age of 18 living with them, 39.9% were married couples living together, 14.9% had a female householder with no husband present, and 38.8% were non-families. 32.7% of households were one person and 14.0% were one person aged 65 or older.  The average household size was 2.41 and the average family size was 3.08.

The age distribution was 25.5% under the age of 18, 6.8% from 18 to 24, 27.1% from 25 to 44, 24.3% from 45 to 64, and 16.4% 65 or older.  The median age was 38 years. For every 100 females, there were 102.4 males.  For every 100 females age 18 and over, there were 103.6 males.

The median household income was $33,958 and the median family income  was $40,833. Males had a median income of $39,306 versus $22,500 for females. The per capita income for the city was $19,767.  About 12.4% of families and 15.0% of the population were below the poverty line, including 25.0% of those under age 18 and 6.0% of those age 65 or over.

Politics

Notes

References

External links

Cities in Sacramento County, California
Cities in Sacramento metropolitan area
Sacramento–San Joaquin River Delta
1923 establishments in California
Populated places established in 1923
Incorporated cities and towns in California